Praveen Prem (born on 21 April 1984) is a south Indian film actor who began his acting career in 2010 in the Malayalam language film Kadha Thudarunnu. His first major role in Malayalam cinema came through the movie Tournament – Play & Replay directed by Lal in which he played Usman Ali. Prem next appeared as several comedy characters in Malayalam movies, taking on the role of the hero Kiran in the 2013 movie Crocodile Love Story. Prem made his debut in the Tamil film industry in 2014 after director O.S. Ravi cast him as the male lead in the movie Dummy Tappasu.

Prem appeared as one of five idiots in K. S. Bava's 2012 comedy Idiots. His character cycle in the movie 7th Day garnered praise from critics and the film went on to become the first 2014 Malayalam blockbuster.

Background
A native of Maruthoorkadavu, Trivandrum in the Indian state of Kerala, after secondary education Prem obtained a certificate in film and video editing from the state-owned Keltron. He started his film career as an assistant editor to south Indian film editor Mahesh Narayanan in 2008. He assisted him for one year on several feature and advertising films. After he left editing, Prem joined Soorya Krishnamoorthy to become part of his Soorya Theatre Group, appearing in amateur theatre plays in 2009. The two plays in which he appeared for SooryaPulari and Sookshmacharcha helped in his transition to movie acting and were staged all over Kerala and Muscat. He received his first movie approach from Malayalam director Sathyan Anthikad in 2010.

He became a television anchor in 2013 on the cookery show Pacchamulaku shown on Media One TV.

Filmography
Films

Television

References

External links
 Ramya and Praveen Prem at Dummy Tappasu Movie Audio Launch at YouTube

1984 births
Living people
Male actors from Thiruvananthapuram
Male actors in Malayalam cinema
Indian male film actors
21st-century Indian male actors